Sean Maguire was the first album released by the former EastEnders star, Sean Maguire. Maguire released three singles from the album, "Someone To Love", "Take This Time" and "Suddenly". The album reached number 75 and only spent one week in the UK album chart.

Track listing

References 

1994 debut albums
Sean Maguire albums